Colin More is a Scottish former professional footballer who played as a defender for Hearts and Raith Rovers.

References

1960 births
Living people
Footballers from Edinburgh
Scottish footballers
Association football defenders
Heart of Midlothian F.C. players
Raith Rovers F.C. players